The .360 bore is one of the smallest shotgun bores. Its main uses included collecting ornithological specimens, pest control, as well as often being used in walking-stick guns. The .360 cartridge was first created by Eley Brothers Ltd, a company founded in 1828 in London. The cartridge never gained widespread popularity, since it offered little improvement over the cheaper 9mm (No. 3 Bore) rimfire, and the .410 was more powerful. Because of its limited use, it is rare to find today. The .360 cartridge was one of the smallest of the shotgun bores, but never achieved widespread popularity. Its main uses were for collecting ornithological specimens and destruction of small vermin. It possessed no real advantage over the much more popular, cheaper 9 mm (No. 3 Bore) rimfire garden gun. A .360 bore load is often defined as "a 2" orange-red paper case with brass head and rolled turnover. White top wad. Loaded with No. 5 shot."

References

Shotgun shells

https://www.iwm.org.uk/collections/item/object/30027828